Natchez is an unincorporated community in Halbert Township, Martin County, in the U.S. state of Indiana.

History
A post office was established at Natchez in 1844, and remained in operation until it was discontinued in 1905. The community was likely named after Natchez, Mississippi.

Geography
Natchez is located at  along U.S. Route 150 in the Hoosier National Forest.

References

Unincorporated communities in Martin County, Indiana
Unincorporated communities in Indiana